Flyer or flier may refer to:

Common meanings
 Aircraft pilot, a person who flies an aircraft 
 Flyer (pamphlet), a single-page leaflet

Arts and entertainment
 Flyer (band), a Croatian pop band
 Flyer (album), by Nanci Griffith
 Flyer (New-Gen), a fictional Marvel Comics superhero
 American Flyer, a toy train and model railroad brand
 Singapore Flyer, a giant Ferris wheel

Military uses
 , a World War II submarine
 General Dynamics Flyer, an Advanced Light Strike Vehicle platform in development

People
 Flier (surname)
 Flyer (wrestler), ring name of a Mexican professional wrestler born 1994

Science and technology
 Fast Low-Ionization Emission Region (FLIER), a poorly understood structure in some planetary nebulae
 HTC Flyer, a tablet computer released by HTC
 Flier (BEAM), a type of robot that can fly

Sports

Ice hockey
 Philadelphia Flyers, a National Hockey League team from Philadelphia, Pennsylvania, United States
 Pensacola Ice Flyers, an ice hockey team from Pensacola, Florida, United States
 Spokane Flyers (senior), an ice hockey team from Spokane, Washington, United States
 Spokane Flyers (junior), an ice hockey team from Spokane, Washington
 Fife Flyers, an ice hockey team from Kirkcaldy, Scotland
 Kloten Flyers, an ice hockey team from Kloten, Switzerland
 Spektrum Flyers, an ice hockey team from Oslo, Norway

Baseball
 Fullerton Flyers, a baseball team from Fullerton, California, United States
 Panama City Fliers, a minor league baseball team based in Panama City, Florida, United States
 Schaumburg Flyers, a baseball team from Schaumburg, Illinois, United States

School teams
 Dayton Flyers, athletic teams of the University of Dayton, Ohio
 Flyers, the sports teams of Waynflete School, Portland, Maine
 Flyers and Lady Flyers, the sports teams of Franklin County High School (Kentucky)

Other sports
 Fort Worth Flyers, a basketball team from Fort Worth, Texas, United States
 Flyer, a position in cheerleading stunts

Transportation

Automobiles
 Flyer (1913 automobile), manufactured by the Flyer Motor Car Company in Michigan, United States, from 1913 to 1914
 Alpena Flyer, an American automobile manufactured between 1910 and 1914 in Alpena, Michigan
 BYD Flyer, manufactured by BYD Auto in Shenzhen, China, since 2004
 Smith Flyer, manufactured by A.O. Smith Company in Milwaukee, United States, from 1915 until about 1919
 Thomas Flyer, manufactured by Thomas Motor Company

Aviation
 Wright Flyer, the first powered aircraft, built and flown by the Wright Brothers in 1903
 Abramovich Flyer, a biplane built by Vsevolod Abramovich in 1912
 Fisher Flyer, a single-engined ultralight biplane built by Michael Fisher in 1980
 Kolb Flyer, a twin-engined ultralight monoplane produced in kit form by Kolb Aircraft from 1980 to 1982
 Pfitzner Flyer, a monoplane designed by Alexander Pfitzner in 1909
 Flyer Indústria Aeronáutica, a Brazilian manufacturer of ultralight aircraft
 Flyer F600 NG, an ultralight aircraft from the Brazilian manufacturer Flyer Industria Aeronáutica Ltda.
 FLYER (magazine), a monthly UK aviation publication

Ships
 Flyer (yacht), with which Conny van Rietschoten won the 1977–1978 Whitbread Round the World Race
 Flyer II (yacht), with which Conny van Rietschoten won the 1981–1982 Whitbread Round the World Race
 Flyer (steamboat), a passenger ship which operated on Puget Sound from 1891 to 1930
 USNS Flyer, a cargo ship launched in 1944

Trains

Australia
 Newcastle Flyer, an express passenger service connecting Newcastle and Sydney from 1929 to 1988

New Zealand
 Kingston Flyer, a vintage steam service begun in 1982
 Kingston Flyer (train), an express passenger service operated between the 1890s and 1957
 Taranaki Flyer, a passenger service between New Plymouth and Wanganui which ended in 1959

United States
 Century Flyer, an historic narrow-gauge train
 Berkshire Flyer, a seasonal Amtrak passenger train service between New York City and the Berkshire Mountains in Pittsfield, Massachusetts
 Champlain Flyer, a commuter service connecting Burlington, Shelburne, and Charlotte, in Vermont, from 2000 to 2003
 Heartland Flyer, a passenger train between Fort Worth, Texas, and Oklahoma City, Oklahoma, begun in 1999
 Valley Flyer, a passenger service between Bakersfield and Oakland, in California, from 1939 to 1942

Buses 
 Flyer (bus service), bus services to Leeds Bradford Airport
 Spondon Flyer, a bus service in England

Other uses
 Flier (fish) (Centrarchus macropterus), a sunfish native to the southern United States
 Memphis Flyer, a free weekly alternative newspaper
 Flyer, one of the two components of a flying buttress
 Flyer, a U-shaped mechanism in a spinning wheel, invented in the late 15th century
 Flyer, a female kangaroo

See also

 New Flyer, a Canadian bus manufacturer